The Glasgow St Rollox by-election was a Parliamentary by-election held on 26 February 1912. The constituency returned one Member of Parliament (MP) to the House of Commons of the United Kingdom, elected by the first past the post voting system.

Previous result

Candidates

Campaign 

The British Socialist Party who were unable to organise themselves a candidate to contest the election, decided nevertheless to campaign in the constituency. They issued a leaflet and toured the various works, lecturing the voters. They were critical of the electoral alliance between the Liberal and Labour parties and called on the electors to vote for the Unionist Party candidate.

Result

Aftermath 
A General Election was due to take place by the end of 1915. By the autumn of 1914, the following candidates had been adopted to contest that election. Due to the outbreak of war, the election never took place

References 

 Craig, F. W. S. (1974). British parliamentary election results 1885–1918 (1 ed.). London: Macmillan.
 Who's Who: www.ukwhoswho.com
 Debrett's House of Commons 1916

1912 elections in the United Kingdom
By-elections to the Parliament of the United Kingdom in Glasgow constituencies
1912 in Scotland
1910s elections in Scotland
Ministerial by-elections to the Parliament of the United Kingdom
1910s in Glasgow
February 1912 events